Jack Elliott at the Second Fret is a live album by American folk musician Ramblin' Jack Elliott, released in 1962.

Reception

Writing for Allmusic, music critic Richie Unterberger wrote the album "It's perhaps a little more fun to hear than the average early 1960s Jack Elliott album, because the live ambience and spoken introductions and asides give it a warmer atmosphere than the earnest but plain studio recordings."

Reissues
Jack Elliott at the Second Fret was reissued as Hootenanny with Jack Elliott in 1964 on the Prestige/Folklore label.
Jack Elliott at the Second Fret was reissued on CD by Fantasy Records in 1999 along with Country Style.

Track listing

Side one
"Mule Skinner Blues" (Jimmie Rodgers, Vaughn Horton)
"Cool Water" (Bob Nolan)
"Talking Miner" (Woody Guthrie)
"Boll Weevil" (Traditional)
"How Long Blues"

Side two
"Salty Dog" (Traditional)
"Tyin' Knots in the Devil's Tail"
"Hobo's Lullaby" (Goebel Reeves)
"Talking Sailor" (Woody Guthrie)
"Rock Island Line" (Lead Belly)

Personnel
Ramblin' Jack Elliott – vocals, harmonica, guitar
Technical
Rudy Van Gelder - mastering
Don Schlitten - design, photography

References

External links
Ramblin' Jack Elliott Illustrated discography

Ramblin' Jack Elliott albums
1962 live albums
albums produced by Esmond Edwards
Prestige Records live albums